Ingar Engum  is a Norwegian handball player.

He made his debut on the Norwegian national team in 1961, 
and played 6 matches for the national team between 1961 and 1962. He participated at the 1961 World Men's Handball Championship.

References

Year of birth missing (living people)
Living people
Norwegian male handball players